Meir Vilner (born Bar Kovner; 23 October 1918 – 5 June 2003)  was an Israeli communist politician and Jewish leader of the Communist Party of Israel (Maki), at one time a powerful force in the country.  He was the youngest and last living signatory of the Israeli Declaration of Independence in 1948.

Early life
Born in Vilnius, during the short lived Kingdom of Lithuania, Vilner's political life began as the leader of the Marxist-oriented socialist-Zionist group HaShomer HaTzair (Young Guard). However, he soon grew disenchanted by what he viewed as a tendency in Zionist groups to dream of a Jewish homeland in Palestine, rather than change their current situation. Thus, he started working for the banned Polish Communist Partynow under the pseudonym Meir Vilneruntil 1938, when he left Poland to go to the British Mandate of Palestine. Most of his family was murdered in the Holocaust.  Vilner then studied history at the Hebrew University of Jerusalem.

Political career

Joining the Palestine Communist Party
In what would soon become Israel, Vilner was disenchanted with the politics, claiming that the hatred directed at Jews in Vilna was now directed at the Arabs. He joined the Palestine Communist Party (PCP), which accepted Arab and Jewish membership, and initially opposed partition of Palestine; in his testimony to the Anglo-American Commission of Inquiry in March 1946, he said that it would strangle economic development, strengthen the dependency of both states on outside aid and widen the gulf between Arabs and Jews. However he supported the 1947 UN Partition Plan after the Soviet position changed in 1947.

Vilner criticized both the Mandate authorities and various Zionist insurgency groups, and fruitlessly attempted to have the Israeli Declaration of Independence include a section denouncing the British mandate and military. Besides, the PCP stressed that the Charter contained a promise to help implement the UN resolutions providing for two independent states, Israel and Arab Palestine, and to uphold full equality and civil liberties for all Israeli citizens.

As a member of the Knesset
In 1949, he was elected to the Knesset as a member of Maki. He resigned from the Knesset in December 1959, six weeks after the 1959 elections, but was re-elected in 1961. However, he resigned again two months after the 1961 elections.

As the Jewish leader of the Communist Party of Israel (CPI), 95% of whose members were Arabs, he rejected Zionism, publicized the Israeli nuclear weapons program in 1963, and opposed the imposition of martial rule on Israeli Arabs (it was lifted in 1966).

In 1965 Vilner and several other Maki members broke away from the party to form the new party Rakah following disagreements about the Soviet Union's increasingly anti-Israeli stance (Vilner was on the USSR's side), and was elected to the Knesset on the new party's list in the 1965 elections.

On 5 June 1967, Vilner was the sole Jewish deputy (joined only by fellow Communist Party of Israel deputy Tawfik Toubi) to speak out in the Knesset against the Six-Day War. Calling that day the darkest in Israel's history, Vilner demanded an immediate halt to the Israeli invasion of Arab-occupied lands. Vilner stressed that there was no other way to solve the conflict between Israel and its neighbors but mutual recognition of the national rights of Israelis and Arabs, including the right of the Palestinians to self-determination and independent statehood. On 15 October, he was badly wounded by a member of the right-wing party Gahal.

Rakah became part of Hadash before the 1977 elections, and Vilner remained an MK until 1990 when he resigned as part of a seat rotation agreement, making him the third longest serving after Tawfik Toubi and Shimon Peres.

Soviet ties
Vilner's Soviet loyalist line was highly appreciated by the USSR; in 1978 he was awarded the Order of Friendship of Peoples. He did not accept perestroika and regarded the fall of communism in the USSR as a coup.

Personal life
He was married to Esther Vilenska, another Israeli communist politician but divorced later, after having two sons together. His cousin Abba Kovner was a well-known Israeli poet and partisan resistance leader during the Holocaust.

References

External links

1918 births
2003 deaths
Politicians from Vilnius
Lithuanian Jews
Polish emigrants to Mandatory Palestine
Signatories of the Israeli Declaration of Independence
Maki (political party) leaders
Maki (historical political party) politicians
Hadash politicians
Members of the 1st Knesset (1949–1951)
Members of the 2nd Knesset (1951–1955)
Members of the 3rd Knesset (1955–1959)
Members of the 4th Knesset (1959–1961)
Members of the 5th Knesset (1961–1965)
Members of the 6th Knesset (1965–1969)
Members of the 7th Knesset (1969–1974)
Members of the 8th Knesset (1974–1977)
Members of the 9th Knesset (1977–1981)
Members of the 10th Knesset (1981–1984)
Members of the 11th Knesset (1984–1988)
Members of the 12th Knesset (1988–1992)
Jewish socialists
Burials at Yarkon Cemetery